Leyre Romero Gormaz (born 6 April 2002) is a Spanish tennis player.

Romero Gormaz has a career-high singles ranking of 164 by the Women's Tennis Association (WTA), achieved on 9 January 2023, and a best WTA doubles ranking of 195, reached on 30 January 2023.

Romero Gormaz won her first major ITF title at the 2022 ITF World Tennis Tour Gran Canaria in the doubles draw, partnering Jéssica Bouzas Maneiro.

Grand Slam performance timeline

Singles

ITF finals

Singles: 7 (6 titles, 1 runner-up)

Doubles: 8 (5 titles, 3 runner–ups)

References

External links
 
 

2002 births
Living people
Spanish female tennis players